is a Japanese actress from Kumamoto Prefecture and affiliated to the talent agency Amuse. She is also talented in gymnastics, a trait that was demonstrated in her role as Asuna Yamase in 2015 Ultra Series, Ultraman X.

Filmography

Films

Television drama

Other Television

References

External links
 

1995 births
Living people
21st-century Japanese actresses
People from Kumamoto Prefecture
Amuse Inc. talents
21st-century Japanese singers
21st-century Japanese women singers